Jorge Comellas (December 7, 1916 – September 13, 2001) was a Cuban pitcher in Major League Baseball who played for the Chicago Cubs during the 1945 season. Listed at 6' 0", 190 lb., he batted and threw right handed.

External links

1916 births
2001 deaths
Algodoneros de Torreón players
Chicago Cubs players
Fort Lauderdale Braves players
Greenville Spinners players
Havana Cubans players
Los Angeles Angels (minor league) players
Major League Baseball players from Cuba
Cuban expatriate baseball players in the United States
Major League Baseball pitchers
Mexican League baseball pitchers
Pittsfield Electrics players
Portsmouth Cubs players
Salisbury Cardinals players
Salisbury Indians players
Salisbury Senators players
Baseball players from Havana
Springfield Nationals players
Springfield Rifles players
Trenton Senators players
Tuneros de San Luis Potosí players
Utica Braves players
York White Roses players